The Czech Mint (Česká mincovna) is a mint located in the Czech Republic which is responsible for producing coins of the Czech koruna. The mint was established in 1992 following the country's dissolution from Czechoslovakia where coins of the Czechoslovak koruna were produced at the Kremnica Mint in Slovakia.

References

Mints (currency)
Mints of Europe
Currencies of the Czech Republic
 
Manufacturing companies of the Czech Republic
Czech companies established in 1993